Adventures of Malia is a 2015 independent animation short film directed, animated and written by Shubhavi Arya. The film was completed by Shubhavi Arya at the age of 16 years.

Adventures of Malia held its US premiere on 21 March 2015 at the School Daze Movie Fest in Oregon. As of November 2015, it has been accepted in competition by more than 30 international film festivals including the 51st Chicago International Film Festival, the 2015 Arlington International Film Festival and the ENIMATION Little Elephant - International Children and Youth Film Festival. The film got nominated for 11 international film awards, winning 3 of them including the Honorary Mention Foreign Film Award at the ColorTape International Film Festival, Australia and Best Under 18 Filmmaker at the Global Independent Film Awards, United States.

Plot 
In order to save her home from rampant pollution, a little girl goes in search of a magical spell and transforms into a mermaid.

Development 
After Shubhavi Arya worked as an animator at the age of 12 years in the short film "ZAP" and received critical acclaim at numerous international film festivals including Viborg Animation Festival, Denmark and Golden Snail International Animation Film Festival, Serbia, she set about developing her own material for her own next project. After an unusually long development period, the film was completed by Shubhavi Arya in February 2015 at the age of 16 years. The trailer of the film was released online on 11 February 2015. Adventures of Malia is created using cutout and stop-motion animation techniques.

Critical reception and reviews 
The film gained national and international recognition. The film has received mostly rave reviews. Jury members from the CINE Golden Eagle Awards noted "There are some fantastic details captured in this stop motion. The sound design really adds to the visual environment. This is very impressive for a 16-year-old!" and "Amazing talent. Great use of sound". Rock and Roll Film Festival 2015, Kenya agrees by saying "16-year-old, Shubhavi Arya, shows great promise as she writes, directs and animates "The Adventures of Malia". If she carries on like this, it won't be long before she is winning a lot of awards for her work." Other praise included jury of the Underexposed Film Festival who said "There is something great about seeing a film which celebrates its naive style. I was delighted by some of the treatments that the filmmaker brought to the piece. The smoke was well done for example and I really liked the fact that not everything was just a straight visual representation of what was being said. I also liked the fact that the underwater sequences were graded differently to give those scenes a distinctive look. It also had an excellent use of colour and the vibrant style was good to see. Once Shubhavi hones her craft, she may well produce some very interesting work." Insight Curation Scheme, United Kingdom noted its key influences "I like the animation style very much and the clear and bold shapes in the film (e.g. the green clouds and wind farm), reminding me of Richard Scarry and the original Moomins animated series. It's a warm and witty world to travel through with a strong eco-theme. There are some wonderful creatures here and I love the lo-fi Mighty Booshness of the film's aesthetic and its slow pace." The general consensus praised the film's animated setting, vibrant visuals and pleasant undertones.

The film received numerous international awards and was selected for screening at several international film festivals. It was the only selection from India at many international film festivals including the 51st Chicago International Film Festival – Cine Youth 2015, US and Kratka Forma – The International Festival of Short Films 2015, Serbia. Adventures of Malia was the only film directed by an Under 18-year-old at the Twister Alley Film Festival 2015, US. It received critical acclaim all around the world and was screened in over 48 film festivals in over 18 countries. Adventures of Malia made it into the quarter-finals at the ColorTape International Film Festival 2015, Brisbane, Australia. Adventures of Malia made it into the Top 16 films for the Foreign Film Award at the ColorTape International Film Festival 2015, Brisbane, Australia. It was the only Indian film to be a winner in the Global Independent Film Awards, US in August 2015.

Awards and nominations

Official selections and screenings

References

External links 
 
 
 Adventures of Malia at the ENIMATION Little Elephant, Slovenia
 Adventures of Malia – Social Seam
 Adventures of Malia at IN.S.A.N.E., Sweden

2015 films
Indian independent films
Stop-motion animated short films
Cutout animation films
2010s stop-motion animated films
Indian animated short films
2010s animated short films
2010s English-language films